The Empire Statesmen Drum and Bugle Corps was an all-age or senior drum corps based in Rochester, New York, United States.  They were the only all-age corps to place in the top four of the DCA finals for 24 years straight (1988–2011) including five first place finishes in that same span.

History
The Empire Statesmen organization gave performances in over a dozen countries and on three continents. It was founded by the late Vincent Bruni. The Empire Statesmen Drum & Bugle Corps and the Empire Cadets were formerly known as The Little Americans.

Many of the performers were from the Greater Rochester Area, located within the State of New York, and throughout the United States and Canada.

The Empire Statesmen were a 501(c)(3) non-profit corporation.

DCA Championship

1997
The 1997 season featured music from the Broadway musical Miss Saigon.  The Empire Statesmen tied for first place with the Syracuse Brigadiers at the DCA World Championships in Allentown, Pennsylvania with a final score of 97.300.  The Statesmen were undefeated throughout the regular competition season, only being beaten in the Championship Preliminary competition the day before finals.

1998
The Empire Statesmen's 1998 program featured selections from the hit Broadway musical and film West Side Story.  The Statesmen returned to Allentown, Pennsylvania and topped off an undefeated season with a first place score of 97.900 at the DCA World Championships.

2004
The Empire Statesmen's 2004 program featured songs from the musical City of Angels.  With a final score of 96.513, the Statesmen won their 5th DCA Championship in Scranton, PA.

Inactive
After the 2013 season, the Empire Statesmen played their final notes at DCA Finals in Annapolis, Maryland.

External links 
 Empire Statesmen historical scores
 Empire Statesmen historical repertoires

1983 establishments in New York (state)
Drum Corps Associates corps
Musical groups from Rochester, New York
Musical groups established in 1983
Empire Statesmen
Musical groups disestablished in 2013